The Tiupampan age is a period of geologic time (64.5–62.5 Ma) within the Paleocene epoch of the Paleogene used more specifically with South American land mammal ages (SALMA). It is the oldest SALMA age and precedes the Peligran age.

Etymology 
The age is named after the paleontological site Tiupampa in Bolivia.

Formations

Fossils

Correlations

References

Bibliography 
Chota Formation
 
 

Guaduas Formation
 

Lefipán Formation
 

Maria Farinha Formation
 

Salamanca Formation
 
 
 
 
 

Santa Lucía Formation
 
 
 
 
 
 
 
 
 

 
Paleocene South America
Paleogene Bolivia